Amarzukih (born 21 June 1984) is an Indonesian semi-professional footballer who plays for Liga 3 club Persipasi Kota Bekasi Mainly a central midfielder, he can also operate as a full-back, defensive midfielder.

Club career

Persita Tangerang
He was signed for Persita Tangerang to play in Liga 2 in the 2019 season.

Persekat Tegal
In 2020, Amarzukih signed a contract with Indonesian Liga 2 club Persekat Tegal. This season was suspended on 27 March 2020 due to the COVID-19 pandemic. The season was abandoned and was declared void on 20 January 2021.

Farmel FC
He was signed for Farmel F.C. to play in Liga 3 in the 2021 season.

Persipasi Kota Bekasi
He was signed for Persipasi Kota Bekasi to play in Liga 3 in the 2022 season. On 24 September 2022, Amarzukih made his league debut by starting in a 2–0 win against Persitas Tasikmalaya . And he also playing as a captain for the team.

Honours

Club
PSS Sleman
 Liga 2: 2018
Persita Tangerang
 Liga 2 runner-up: 2019

References

External links
 
 Amarzukih at Liga Indonesia

1984 births
Indonesian footballers
Living people
Indonesian Muslims
People from Jakarta
Betawi people
Sportspeople from Jakarta
Persitara Jakarta Utara players
Persija Jakarta players
PSMS Medan players
PSS Sleman players
Persita Tangerang players
Persipasi Bekasi players
Indonesian Premier Division players
Liga 1 (Indonesia) players
Liga 2 (Indonesia) players
Association football midfielders